Sripur is a tourist spot in Bangladesh's Sylhet district. It is well known for its waterfalls, which span across the Bangladesh-India border.

In 2001, a crater on Mars was named Srīpur in honour of the town.

Gallery

References

External links

Sylhet District